Anna Girò (also Girrò or Giraud), also known as l'Annina del Prete Rosso, la Nina del Prete Rosso, or l'Annina della Pietà, was the stage name of Anna Maria(?) Maddalena Tessieri (or Tesieri, Teseire or Testeiré), an Italian mezzo-soprano/contralto of the 18th century. She is best remembered for her numerous collaborations with composer Antonio Vivaldi  who wrote operatic roles for her. She is the singer who performed the greatest number of Vivaldi's operas, the one who kept them in her repertoire the longest time and who made them known across the largest geographical area.

Early life and career

Mantua
Anna Girò was born in Mantua in 1710 or a few years earlier. She was the daughter of a wig maker of French descent called Pietro, whose surname Giraud was made into Girò  in italian and passed onto the offspring in its italianized graphy. Her mother was Bartolomea, widow of Giacomo Trevisan.

Venice
At twelve she was sent to Venice to study singing. There, she was welcomed by her half-sister Paolina who was twenty years her senior and already a resident there. (Paolina assisted Anna throughout her career.) Still very young, Anna made her debut in Treviso in 1723 and in Venice in 1724. She first sang roles en travesti and soon female roles followed. With her musical and acting talents she conquered the Venetian Opera Stage in a single year.She soon started a close professional collaboration with Antonio Vivaldi. She had been his student, was now his protégée, and soon would be his favorite prima donna.

Meeting Vivaldi
Anna may have become acquainted with Vivaldi during his time in Mantua between 1718 and 1720. She was then an aspiring young singer and she may have been his student there. In any case, it is fair to assume that she would have met Antonio Vivaldi and sang some of his music for the first time between 1720 and 1723, as, by then, she was a student at the famous Ospedale della pietà, an "orphanage-cum-conservatoire where he was composer in residence". Vivaldi had recently been promoted to the specially created office of Maestro de' Concerti and was in charge of the Figlie di Choro (the musicians), the élite of the Pietà. It is not clear though how Anna was enrolled for the Pietà was "a home for abandoned and unwanted babies, not (as is often stated) a convent or a school for girls." Part of Vivaldi's job was to train those girls to sing and play instruments during services at La Pietà. Under his direction the choro became so famous that they attracted visitors from across Europe and a visit to the Pietà had become a feature of the Grand Tour. (Vivaldi wrote many works for the girls of this establishment (and of course when Anna was a student there), including, for instance, the Kyrie RV587, the Dixit RV594, the Domine RV593 etc.).

Dorilla in Tempe
Dorilla in Tempe, which premiered at the Teatro Sant' Angelo in Venice on 9 November 1726, was the first opera by Vivaldi to include Anna Girò in its cast. In this opera she sings the role of Eudamia, the seconda donna. The arias written for her by Vivaldi were made to fit her singing abilities perfectly. (Her voice was not strong, but she was attractive and acted well.) For Anna - who will go through thick and thin with him for a long time - he gives priority to sincerity over virtuosity. The captivating aria “Al mio amore il tuo risponda” from Act I, Scene 8, which she would have performed for the first time here, would be included in other future operas.
The plaintive “Il povero mio core” from Act III, Scene 4 🎼, although interpreted by Angela Capuano as Dorilla at the premiere, was reprised by Anna Girò as an aria di baule that she would sing throughout her career. (The arie di baule or "suitcase arias" are an integral part of the traveling singers' luggage. They had them ready at every opportunity.)Dorilla in Tempe was well received and became especially popular with its choirs and ballets. It also became one of Vivaldi's personal favorites. Anna appeared in nearly all his operas after that.

Repertoire

[[File:Motezuma Vivaldi Aria End Act2.jpg|thumb|centre|upright=5|<small>The first two pages of the aria "La figlia, lo sposo written specifically for Anna Girò. This aria concludes the second act of Vivaldi's Motezuma. The music of Motezuma was thought to have been lost in its entirety, but fragments of it, among which this aria, were discovered in 2002 in the archive of the music library of the Sing-Akademie zu Berlin.</small>]]

List of shows in chronological order

 Vivaldi's and Girò's professional collaboration in figures 

(Based on the information available to us - see above table)

1. From their first premiere together to their last:
 12 years span
 14 original productions (including premieres). i.e. 14 roles written by Vivaldi specifically for Anna.
2. From their first show together to their last:
 15 years span
 22 productions (including revivals and revised versions)
3. Their collaboration represents 15 years out of:
 21 years (Anna). (length of her career whilst Vivaldi was alive)
 18 years (Vivaldi) (length of his opera career whilst Anna was active professionally)
4. Their partnership lasted until the very death of the composer in 1741, or very close to it.

This sort of long and fruitful professional collaboration is unheard of concerning Vivaldi. And generally speaking, it was rather uncommon.
For instance, Senesino, whom we consider as closely associated with George Frideric Handel for the many famous operas they collaborated on, spent 13 years working with Handel, out of 33 years (length of his career whilst Handel was alive). Together they created 16 roles and collaborated on 3 revivals. Finally, they stopped their partnership 7 years before the death of the composer.

 Private life 
Without a patron
With the exception of Alderano Cybo-Malaspina, Duke of Massa and Carrara (who in 1725, through Vivaldi, gave her money for the purchase of a harpsichord), she seems to have always worked without depending on patrons. (Alderano dissipated the assets and heritage accumulated by the Cybo dynasty, including the Duchy of Massa and Carrara itself.)

Last journey with Vivaldi
In 1741, on his way to Vienna where he wished to take up the position of a composer in the imperial court, Vivaldi may have stopped in Graz to see Anna Girò, and she likely went with him on his journey. Her schedule seems to support this theory as the records show that she was in Graz in 1740 and 1741 and then in Vienna in 1742. Vivaldi was hoping to make a fresh start in Vienna.

However his asthma, exhaustion and the death of the music-loving Emperor Charles VI, one of his great admirers, put an end to the project before it had even begun, and the composer died on 28 July of the same year at the age of 63.

A secret wedding
In 1748, while on tour in Piacenza, Anna met Count Antonio Maria Zanardi Landi, a local nobleman. He followed her back to Venice and persuaded her to marry him, despite the disparity of their conditions. They married in secret on 20 July 1748 in Venice.

Later life
From 1748, there are no more records of her. She possibly retired from the stage and moved to Piacenza. There is no record of her death, so it is not known when and where she died.

 Private relationship with Vivaldi 
 

Speculations
Vivaldi's contemporaries and modern scholars have speculated on the nature of the composer's and Girò's relationship, but no evidence exists to indicate anything beyond friendship and professional collaboration. Vivaldi in fact adamantly denied any romantic relationship with Girò in a letter to his patron Bentivoglio dated 16 November 1737.

All'Ospedale della Pietà
In 2008, Susan Orlando - director of the Vivaldi Edition for Naive/Opus111 - writes in The Guardian:
"From 1703 to 1735, Vivaldi [..] played the role of music master and composer to the young girls living at La Pietà. Imagining Vivaldi [...] in a role of both authority and intimacy among these vulnerable young women, has seduced writers and film-makers into fantasising about the erotic potential of the scenario. It is easy to imagine a libidinous red-haired priest exploiting the privileges of the cloth, in an institution that even 17th- and 18th-century visitors described with thinly veiled salaciousness. [...] [But with regard to] illicit affairs, we have nothing to go on."

A priest's "Perpetua"
S. Orlando continues: "A better documented trail leads to Vivaldi's muse, Anna Giro. [sic.] In 1724, this promising young singer and her elder half-sister, acting as chaperone, moved in with Vivaldi. [...] She was closely affiliated with him until the end of his life. Again, the titillating image of a "loose" priest comes up. In truth, this arrangement may not have been so shocking in an age in which priests traditionally maintained a life-long, live-in "perpetua" - a woman who dedicated her time to the priest as cook, house cleaner and general companion. But Anna held a special place in Vivaldi's heart; in opera after opera he wrote roles specifically for her, moulding the music to her particular vocal strengths and weaknesses. No other singer received such consistent attention and privilege from the composer. In 1738 Vivaldi was refused entrance to the city of Ferrara where his opera Farnace was to be performed. The city's new cardinal was making a moral point - his disapproval of a priest involved in the frivolities of the operatic world and living under the same roof as a female singer. These are the scant facts we have to go on [...] But Vivaldi consistently denied any wrongdoing."

Goldoni's account and the Virgin Mary
Letting us draw our own conclusions, S. Orlando tells us two anecdotes: "Carlo Goldoni [the famous Venetian playwright who collaborated with him on his opera Griselda] has left us a vivid description of his first meeting with Vivaldi in 1735. He arrived to find the composer engrossed in meditational reading and describes him clutching his missal throughout the interview - signs of, at the very least, a modicum of religious conviction."

"To this should be added that Vivaldi signed many of his music scores, especially but not exclusively the operas and sacred music, with an extravagant dedication to the Virgin Mary."

 In popular culture 

 Cinema 

 In the 1989 Franco-Italian fictional comedy-thriller Venetian Red (Rouge Venise / Rosso Veneziano) directed by Etienne Périer, Anna Girò ("La Girò") is played by actress Catherine Lachens.
 In the 2006 French fictional drama Antonio Vivaldi, Un Prince à Venise directed by Jean-Louis Guillermou, Anna Girò is played by actress Annette Schreiber and her sister is played by actress Diana Fertikh.

 Books (fiction) 

 Romijn, André (2007) Hidden Harmonies The Secret Life of Antonio Vivaldi. Roman House Publishers Ltd.
 Bruce Kelly, Sarah (2009) The Red Priest's Annina: A Novel of Vivaldi and Anna Girò. Bel Canto Press.

 Discography 
Many roles once sung or created by Anna Girò have been interpreted and recorded by mezzo-sopranos, contraltos or countertenors. The musical links below  (🎼) will take you to audio recordings of some of Anna's arias that survived the centuries.

Vinci. Catone in Utica. Emilia: Vince Yi. Riccardo Minasi, Il pomo d’oro. Decca 01588194. 2015. 🎼

Vivaldi. Armida all Campo d'Egitto. Armida: Sara Mingardo. Rinaldo Alessandrini, Concerto Italiano. Naïve/Opus111 OP30492. 2010 🎼

Vivaldi. Atenaide. Pulcheria: Guillemette Laurens. Federico Maria Sardelli, Modo Antiquo. Naïve/Opus111 Vivaldi Edition OP30438. 2007 🎼

Vivaldi. Bajazet. Asteria: Marijana Mijanović. Fabio Biondi, Europa Galante. Virgin VCDW 545676-2. 2005 🎼

Vivaldi. Catone in Utica. Marzia: Liliana Faraon. Jean-Claude Malgoire. La Grande Ecurie et la Chambre du Roy. Dynamic 403/1-2. 2002 🎼

Vivaldi. Catone in Utica. Marzia: Sonia Prina. Alan Curtis, Il Complesso Barocco. Naïve OP30545. 2013 🎼

Vivaldi. Dorilla in Tempe. Eudamia: Consuelo Caroli. Gilbert Bezzina, Ensemble Baroque de Nice. Pierre Verany PV794092. 1994 🎼

Vivaldi. Dorilla in Tempe. Eudamia: Sonia Prina. Diego Fasolis, I Barocchisti. Opus111/Naïve. OP30560. 2017 🎼

Vivaldi. Farnace. Tamiri: Ruxandra Donose. Diego Fasolis, I Barocchisti. Virgin Classics 2011 🎼

Vivaldi. Farnace. Tamiri: Sara Mingardo. Jordi Savall, Le Concert Des Nations. Opus111/Naïve. OP30471. 2009
🎼

Vivaldi. Griselda. Griselda: Marie-Nicole Lemieux. Jean-Christophe Spinosi, Ensemble Mattheus. Opus111/Naïve OP30419. 2006 🎼

Vivaldi. Griselda. Griselda: Caitlin Hulcup. Erin Helyard, Orchestra of the Antipodes. Pinchgut Live PG002. 2011 🎼

Vivaldi. Griselda. Griselda: Marion Newman. Kevin Mallon, Aradia Ensemble. Naxos 8.660211-13. 2008 🎼

Vivaldi. Motezuma. Mitrena: Marijana Mijanović. Alan Curtis, Il Complesso Barocco. DG-Archiv 477 599-6. 2006 🎼

Vivaldi. Orlando furioso. Alcina: Jennifer Larmore. Jean-Christophe Spinosi, Ensemble Mattheus. Opus111/Naïve OP30393. 2004 🎼

Vivaldi. Orlando furioso. Alcina: Marina de Liso. Federico Maria Sardelli, Modo Antiquo. cpo 777095-2. 2008 🎼

Vivaldi. Rosmira. Rosmira: Marianna Pizzolato.  Gilbert Bezzina, Ensemble Baroque de Nice. Dynamic CDS437/1-3. 2003 🎼La Ninfa Infelice e Fortunata. This pasticcio is likely to have reused a number of arias from Vivaldi's La Verità in Cimento'''. It marked the operatic debut of Anna Girò. Frédéric Delaméa writes in the liner notes to the Naive/Opus111 recording of La Verità in Cimento (OP 30365. 2003) that it "bears the stamp" of Vivaldi.

Notes

References
 Vivaldi's Muse by Sarah Bruce Kelly, Bel Canto Press 2011, 
 The Red Priest's Annina by Sarah Bruce Kelly, Bel Canto Press 2009, 
Fonti e Bibl.: C. Goldoni, Delle commedie, XIII, Venezia 1761, pp. 10-13; Id., Mémoires de M. Goldoni, pour servir à l’histoire de sa vie, et à celle de son théâtre, I, Paris 1787, pp. 286-291
A. Cavicchi, Inediti nell’epistolario Vivaldi-Bentivoglio, in Nuova Rivista musicale italiana, I (1967), pp. 45-79; J.W. HillVivaldi's “Griselda”, in Journal of the American musicological society, XXXI (1978), pp. 53–82; 
M. Talbot, Vivaldi, Torino 1978, ad ind.; L. Moretti, Un cembalo per la Girò, I (1980), pp. 58–60; 
G. Vio, Antonio Vivaldi prete, in Informazioni e studi vivaldiani, 1980, vol. 1, pp. 32–57; 
A.L. Bellina - B. Brizi - M.G. Pensa, Il pasticcio “Bajazet”: la “favola” del Gran Tamerlano nella messinscena di Vivaldi. Nuovi studi vivaldiani. Edizione e cronologia critica delle opere, a cura di A. Fanna - G. Morelli, Firenze 1988, pp. 185–272; 
W.C. Holmes, Vivaldi e il Teatro La Pergola a Firenze: nuove fonti, ibid., pp. 117–130; 
S. Mamy, La diaspora dei cantanti veneziani nella prima metà del Settecento, ibid., pp. 591–631; 
F. Tammaro, I pasticci di Vivaldi: “Dorilla in Tempe”, ibid., pp. 147–184; G. Vio, Per una migliore conoscenza di Anna Girò (da documenti d’archivio), in Informazioni e studi vivaldiani, 1988, vol. 9, pp. 26–44; 
C. Vitali, I fratelli Pepoli contro Vivaldi e Anna Girò. Le ragioni di un’assenza, ibid., 1991, vol. 12, pp. 19–46; 
A. Conti, Lettere da Venezia a Madame la Comtesse de Caylus, 1727-1729, a cura di S. Mamy, Firenze 2003, p. 125; 
R. Strohm, The Operas of Antonio Vivaldi, Firenze 2008, ad ind.; 
G.A. Sechi, Nuove scoperte dal carteggio tra Albizzi e Vivaldi (1735/1736), in Studi vivaldiani, XII (2012), pp. 53–89; 
M. White, Antonio Vivaldi: a life in documents, Firenze 2013, ad ind.; M. Talbot - M. White, A lawsuit and a libretto: new facts concerning the pasticcio “La ninfa infelice e fortunata”, in Studi vivaldiani'', XIV (2014), pp. 45–57
Enciclopedia Treccani
Quell'Usignolo website
BBC4 - Vivaldi's Women

Italian contraltos
Italian mezzo-sopranos
18th-century Italian musicians
Italian people of French descent
Musicians from Mantua
Musicians from Venice
1710s births
Year of death missing